The ShKAS (Shpitalny-Komaritski Aviatsionny Skorostrelny, Shpitalny-Komaritski rapid fire for aircraft; Russian: ШКАС - Шпитального-Комарицкого Авиационный Скорострельный) is a 7.62 mm calibre machine gun widely used by Soviet aircraft in the 1930s and during World War II. The ShKAS had the highest rate of fire of any aircraft machine gun in general service during WWII. It was designed by Boris Shpitalniy and Irinarkh Komaritsky and entered production in 1934. ShKAS was used in the majority of Soviet fighters and bombers and served as the basis for the ShVAK cannon.

Description 
ShKAS is a gas-operated aircraft machine gun; it has a single chamber in which the pin strikes the primer.

A key element of the ShKAS' high rate of fire is the revolving drum (feed cage) that holds ten rounds and provides a very smooth, progressive removal of the cartridges from their disintegrating link belt.

The bolt locking action is Browning-style, i.e. slightly tilted wedge bolt.

The bolt action mechanism is the "gas piston in a tube - rod - bolt frame", rather similar to Kalashnikov's assault rifle.

The main difference with AK is that, with AK, the whole assembly of piston-rod-bolt frame is a single large and heavy part. And, with ShKAS, it is split to several parts - the piston, the rod and the bolt frame, with a "personal" recoil spring for each of them (the weapon has a lot of springs in it).

This provided for the lightweight recoiling portion of the gun, which weighs only 921 grams (2.07 lb).

A declassified US analysis of the feed system, based on models captured during the Korean War, reads:

(Ian V. Hogg called the ShKAS feeding system a "squirrel cage".)

After analysing the less unusual parts of the ShKAS, the US source concludes:

Although ShKAS is best known for its high rate of fire, it did have provision for slower cyclic rates by lowering the gas-pressure. This was done by "changing the position of the holes in the gas regulator, which comes with holes of three different sizes: 2.1 mm (1/12-inch), 2.5 mm (1/10-inch) and 3.2 mm (1/8-inch). The smaller the orifice used, the more moderate is the rate of fire obtained."

Variants 

Initial production consisted of cable-charged wing-mounted and turret-mounted ShKAS with a synchronized version entering service in 1936.

By 1952 Western intelligence had identified five different models, all including the number "426" in their markings:
 a prototype "426" appeared in 1932
 KM-33, in flexible role, appeared in 1933
 KM-35, in flexible role (1934) and wing-mounted (1935)
 KM-36, in flexible role (1935) and propeller-synchronized (1937); the latter had an extra-long barrel
 a 1941 model, wing-mounted

"KM" stands for "constructed model", i.e. production. The intended role was marked with the letters "T" for flexible, "K" for wing, and "S" synchronized. The flexible version was usually mounted in a Soviet copy of the Scarff ring. The 1937 model had slightly higher maximum rate of fire of 2,000 rounds per minute. The amount of ammunition normally carried was 750 rounds for the fixed models and 1,000 to 1,500 for the flexible.

Soviet archives indicate the following production volumes, by year:
 1933 — 365 produced
 1934 — 2,476
 1935 — 3,566
 1937 — 13,005
 1938 — 19,687
 1940 — 34,233
 1943 — 29,450
 1944 — 36,255
 1945 — 12,455
In 1939, a small number of Ultra-ShKAS were produced featuring a firing rate of 3,000 rounds per minute but these saw only limited use due to reliability problems.

Effectiveness 
The ShKAS was the fastest-firing rifle calibre aircraft armament in general service in World War II. A one-second burst from the four ShKAS of a Polikarpov I-153 or Polikarpov I-16 placed 120 bullets within 15 angular mils at 400 meters (1,312 feet) giving a firing density of 5 bullets per square meter of the sky. Moreover, the ShKAS was unusually light as well; the four guns, with 650 rounds of ammunition each, weighed a total of only 160 kg (350 lb).
ShKAS wasn't problem-free though. Soviet machine-gun technician Viktor M. Sinaisky recalled:

Gun specifications 
 Cartridge: 7.62×54mmR
 Calibre: 
 Rate of fire: 1,800 rounds/min wing- or turret-mounted; 1,625 rounds/min synchronized. UltraShKAS: 3,000 rounds/min.
 Muzzle velocity: 
 Weight:  empty;  with 650 rounds of ammunition.

7.62 mm ammunition specifications 
Although chambered in the 7.62×54mmR, the ShKAS guns used cartridges specially built for them to smaller tolerances; to distinguish them from the regular 7.62 ammunition, the Cyrillic letter "Sh" (Ш) was imprinted on the bottom of the cases. The cases, designed by N. M. Elizarov, also had a few additional features like double crimping and a thicker case wall of "bimetallic" construction instead of the traditional brass. The main type of bullet used was armour-piercing incendiary B-32 bullet. Ammunition marked as such should not be fired out of any regular 7.62x54mmR rifles.
 Bullet weight: 148 grains (9.6 grams)
 Round weight: 370 grains (24 grams)
 Ballistic coefficient: 2,100 kg/m2 (3.0 lb/in2)
 Tracer ammunition duration: 750 m (2,460 ft)
 Armour piercing: 11 mm (0.43 in) at 400 m (1,312 ft)

Possible influences 
Some military historians believe the feed system of the Mauser 213C (the seminal revolver cannon for Western designs) was inspired by the ShKAS. However, the method of operation is very different: gas-operation on the ShKAS versus a revolving cam on the MG 213C.

Users 
 
  Second Spanish Republic

See also
 MG 81 machine gun
 Savin-Narov machine gun
 SIBEMAS machine gun
 Vickers K machine gun
 Revolver cannon
 List of firearms
 List of Russian weaponry
 List of common World War II weapons

References
Notes

Bibliography

  Drabkin, Artem. The Red Air Force at War: Barbarossa and the Retreat to Moscow – Recollections of Fighter Pilots on the Eastern Front. Barnsley, South Yorkshire, UK: Pen & Sword Military, 2007. .
 Романов Д. И. Оружие Воздушного Боя (Romanov D.I., Aerial Weapons)
 Chinn, George M. The Machine Gun, Vol II, Part VII. US Department of the Navy, 1952
 Широкорад А.Б. (2001) История авиационного вооружения Харвест (Shirokorad A.B. (2001) Istorya aviatsionnogo vooruzhenia Harvest. ) (History of aircraft armament)

External links

 Ultra-ShKAS photo
 патроны для сверх пулемета

Medium machine guns
World War II machine guns
7.62×54mmR machine guns
Machine guns of the Soviet Union
Cold War firearms of the Soviet Union
Aircraft guns of the Soviet Union
KBP Instrument Design Bureau products
Military equipment introduced in the 1930s